Abercrombie River, a perennial river that is part of the Murray–Darling basin, is located in the central west of New South Wales, Australia.

Course 
The river rises to the east of the village of Mount Werong and generally flows westward towards its confluence with the Lachlan River at Wyangala Dam near Cowra.

The Abercrombie River is the furthest east of the inland flowing rivers.

History 

The original inhabitants of the land alongside the river were Australian Aborigines of the Wiradjuri or Gundungara clans, which may have used the river as a trading route.

The first European to discover the watercourse was explorer Charles Throsby on 5 May 1819, during an expedition from Sydney to the central west of New South Wales. The river was named by Commissioner John Thomas Bigge on 22 October 1820.

Alluvial gold was discovered in and along the river in 1851, inspiring a minor gold rush hampered by the ruggedness of the terrain and the periodic depths of the waterway.

The Goulburn-Oberon Road crosses the Abercrombie River in the steep-sided Abercrombie Gorge.

See also 

 List of rivers of Australia
 List of rivers of New South Wales (A-K)
 Rivers of New South Wales

References

External links 
 

Rivers of New South Wales
Tributaries of the Lachlan River